Young Mrs. Winthrop is an 1882 play by Bronson Howard which debuted on Broadway at the Madison Square Theatre on October 9, 1882, and ran for 183 performances, closing on April 7, 1883.  It was the first play for which David Belasco served as stage manager at the theater.

Original Broadway cast
 Blanche Whiffen as Mrs. Ruth Winthrop
 George Clarke as Mr. Douglas Winthrop (her son)
 Carrie Turner as Constance Winthrop (his wife)
 Thomas Whiffen as Buxton Scott (a lawyer)
 Agnes Booth as Mrs. Dick Chetwyn (a lady of society)
 Maude Stuart as Edith (sister of Constance)
 Henry Miller as Herbert
 William J. Le Moyne as Dr. Mellbanke
 A.T. Smith as John (a footman)

Adaptations
The play was adapted to film in 1915 and 1920.

References

External links

Young Mrs. Winthrop: A Play in Four Acts (1899 book) (full text)

1882 plays